The History of Rock Tour was a concert tour by American Rapper and Singer Kid Rock. This was in support of his compilation album The History of Rock. This was also the last tour to include Joe C. before his death in November 2000.

Setlist 

 Where U at Rock
 Welcome 2 the Party (Ode 2 the Old School)
 Jumpin' Jack Flash (Rolling Stones cover)
 Devil Without a Cause
 Fuck Off
 3 Sheets to the Wind (What's My Name)
 Wasting Time
 Heaven (Uncle Kracker cover)
 What ’Chu Lookin’ At? (Uncle Kracker cover)
 Early Mornin' Stoned Pimp
 Rocky Mountain Way (Joe Walsh cover)
 Born 2 B a Hick
 Prodigal Son
 Only God Knows Why
 Cowboy
 Somebody's Gotta Feel This
 Fist of Rage
 American Bad Ass
 Bawitdaba

Personnel 
Kid Rock – lead vocals

Joe C. – co-vocals

Jason Krause – guitar

Kenny Olson – guitar

Michael Bradford – Bass

Uncle Kracker – turntables, background vocals

Jimmie Bones – keyboard, organ, piano, synth bass

Stefanie Eulinberg – drums, percussion

Tour Dates

References 

2000 concert tours
Concert tours of North America
Concert tours